Appleby Talking is a collection of detective short stories by the British writer Michael Innes published in 1954. John Appleby, a  Golden Age Scotland Yard detective, features in all twenty three stories. The series of novels had run since Death at the President's Lodging in 1936, but this was the first time shorter stories about Appleby's cases had been collected in a single volume. It was followed by a second collection Appleby Talks Again in 1956. It was published in the United States under the alternative title Dead Man's Shoes.

Stories

 Appleby's First Case 
 Pokerwork 
 The Spendlove Papers 
 The Furies 
 Eye Witness 
 The Bandertree Case 
 The Key 
 The Flight of Patroclus
 The Clock-Face Case
 Miss Geach
 Tragedy of a Handkerchief
 The Cave of Belarius 
 A Nice Cup of Tea
 The Sands of Thyme
 The X-Plan
 Lesson in Anatomy 
 Imperious Caesar
 The Clancarron Ball
 A Dog's Life
 A Derby Horse
 William the Conqueror
 Dead Man's Shoes
 The Lion and the Unicorn

References

Bibliography
 Hubin, Allen J. Crime Fiction, 1749-1980: A Comprehensive Bibliography. Garland Publishing, 1984.
 Reilly, John M. Twentieth Century Crime & Mystery Writers. Springer, 2015.
 Scheper, George L. Michael Innes. Ungar, 1986.

1954 short story collections
Mystery short story collections
Novels by Michael Innes
Victor Gollancz Ltd books